The 2013 European Wrestling Championships were held in Tbilisi, Georgia, from 19 March to 24 March 2013.

Medal table

Team ranking

Medal summary

Men's freestyle

Men's Greco-Roman

Women's freestyle

(*) Romanian original silver medallist Estera Dobre was disqualified after her doping sample had been tested positive in August 2013.

Participating nations

390 competitors from 36 nations participated.
 (2)
 (14)
 (11)
 (21)
 (21)
 (20)
 (5)
 (8)
 (2)
 (8)
 (6)
 (7)
 (3)
 (1)
 (14)
 (21)
 (12)
 (21)
 (6)
 (13)
 (6)
 (6)
 (14)
 (2)
 (2)
 (5)
 (13)
 (4)
 (17)
 (21)
 (6)
 (3)
 (9)
 (10)
 (21)
 (21)

References

External links 
 Men's freestyle results 
 Men's Greco-Roman results 
 Women's freestyle results 

 
European Wrestling Championships
Europe
European Wrestling Championships
Wrestling
Wrestling in Georgia (country)
International sports competitions hosted by Georgia (country)
Wrestling Championships
2010s in Tbilisi
European Wrestling Championship